Herman J. Daled (12 June 1930 – 8 November 2020) was a Belgian art collector and radiologist.

Career
Located in Brussels, he specialized in the field of conceptual art. He notably helped to promote the artistic career of Daniel Buren and various other artists through the collection of their works.

In particular, Daled collected art with his wife, Nicole Daled-Verstraeten, in the 1960s. Their collections included works by Jacques Charlier, Richard Long, Marcel Broodthaers, Niele Toroni, On Kawara, Dan Graham, James Lee Byars, Sol LeWitt, and Vito Acconci. In 2011, he sold part of his collection to the Museum of Modern Art.

Daled has several books published, including Rebondissements and Contrat de première cession d’œuvre. He also worked as a radiologist in the field of oncology. He was influenced by Nobel Prize in Physiology or Medicine winner Albert Claude to enter the field of art.

Herman Daled died in Ixelles on 8 November 2020 at the age of 90.

Works
L'Imagerie du contenu pelvien (1988).  
Wiels ! (2003). Brussels: Centrum voor Hedendaagse Kunst 2003.  
A bit of matter and a little bit more the Collection and the Archives of Herman and Nicole Daled 1966 - 1978 (2010). Cologne: König.

References

1930 births
2020 deaths
Belgian art collectors
Physicians from Bruges
Belgian writers
Belgian radiologists